Tapiola Bank Ltd was a Finnish bank and a part of Tapiola Group, now LähiTapiola. Tapiola was originally only in the insurance business, but entered also the banking market in 2004 with Tapiola Bank. Loyalty benefits (50–100% discount from service fees) are given to customers who have both insurance contracts and bank accounts at Tapiola.

Starting on 1 January 2013, it began being merged into S-Bank. The merger was completed in May 2014.

See also

Companies based in Espoo
Defunct banks of Finland
Banks established in 2004
Finnish companies established in 2004

Banks disestablished in 2014